

Biography 
Thomas Bayless Ward (April 27, 1835 – January 1, 1892) was an American lawyer, jurist, and politician who served two terms as a U.S. Representative from Indiana from 1883 to 1887.

Born in Marysville, Ohio, Ward moved with his parents to Lafayette, Indiana, in May 1836. He attended Wabash College, Crawfordsville, Indiana, and graduated from Miami University, Oxford, Ohio, in June 1855.

He served as clerk of the city of Lafayette in 1855 and 1856. He was admitted to the bar in 1857 and began practicing law in Lafayette. He served as the city attorney in 1859 and 1860 and as mayor from 1861 to 1865. Later, he served as judge of the superior court of Tippecanoe County, Indiana from 1875 to 1880.

Congress 
Ward was elected as a Democrat to the Forty-eighth and Forty-ninth Congresses (March 4, 1883 – March 3, 1887).

Later career and death 
He resumed the practice of law in Lafayette, where he died January 1, 1892. He was interred in Springvale Cemetery.

References

1835 births
1892 deaths
People from Marysville, Ohio
Miami University alumni
Indiana state court judges
Indiana lawyers
Mayors of Lafayette, Indiana
Democratic Party members of the United States House of Representatives from Indiana
19th-century American politicians
19th-century American judges
19th-century American lawyers